Zhenis Makhmuduly Kassymbek (Jeñıs Mahmūdūly Qasymbek, ; born 7 May 1975) is a Kazakh politician who is currently serving as the Äkım of Astana since December 2022.

Biography

Early life and education 
The son of Mahmud Kassymbek, Zhenis Kassymbek was born to a Muslim family in the village of Shu. In 1997 he graduated from the Kazakh Leading Academy of Architecture and Civil Engineering as an architectural designer.

In 2001, he graduated from the  L. N. Gumilyov Eurasian National University.

Career 
After graduating in 1997, Kassymbek was a trainee researcher at the Kazakh Haed Architecture and Civil Engineering Academy. In 1998, he became a chief specialist of Temirbank OJSC.

From 1998 to 2000, Kassymbek served as the head of Department of the Committee on Antimonopoly Policy of the Republic of Kazakhstan. In 2000, he became the director of the Department of Water Transport of the Ministry of Transport and Communications of the Republic of Kazakhstan until becoming the director of the RSE Aktau International Sea Trade Port.

On 4 November 2005, he was appointed as a Vice Minister of Transport and Communications and from 11 March 2009, Kassymbek was the executive secretary of the Ministry of Transport and Communications. 

On 7 March 2014, he became a Minister of Transport and Communications until the ministry was abolished on 6 August 2014. Shortly after, Kassymbek was appointed as the First Vice Minister for Investment and Development on 13 August 2014. He became its Minister on 21 June 2016 and served that position until the government was dismissed in February 2019.

Following formation of Mamin's cabinet, Kassymbek was appointed as the Deputy Prime Minister of Kazakhstan on 25 February 2019. He served that post before becoming the akim of Karaganda Region on 19 September 2019.

Rewards 
Kazakhstan awards

References 

Government ministers of Kazakhstan
Ministers of Transport and Communications (Kazakhstan)

1975 births
Living people
Nur Otan politicians